David Lodge FRS is a research fellow in the Department of Physiology and Pharmacology at the University of Bristol.

Education
Lodge was awarded a Bachelor of Veterinary Science degree in 1963 and worked in University of Bristol as a surgeon and anaesthetist, before doing postgraduate research with Tim J. Biscoe on the neuropharmacology of amino acids, he was awarded his PhD in 1974.

Research and career
During postdoctoral studies at the Australian National University with David Curtis, he helped establish the role of glutamate as a central neurotransmitter and characterised its actions between AMPA, N-Methyl-D-aspartic acid (NMDA) and kainate receptor subtypes. At the Royal Veterinary College, Lodge linked his interests in anaesthesia and glutamate receptors by making the key discovery that the dissociative anaesthetics, ketamine and phencyclidine, selectively blocked NMDA receptors. He related NMDA receptor antagonism to psychotomimetic effects. This provided a basis for the glutamate hypothesis of schizophrenia and redirected pharmaceutical search for schizophrenia therapies. David was recruited as a director of Eli Lilly's neuroscience program, where he helped develop glutamate receptor approaches to brain diseases, resulting in clinical trials, e.g. for schizophrenia, some of which are ongoing. , Lodge's research concerns the mechanism of action of new ‘legal highs’ and the consequences of spontaneous mutations in glutamate receptors.

Awards and honours
Lodge was elected a Fellow of the Royal Society (FRS) in 2016 and a Fellow of the Academy of Medical Sciences. He was awarded a Doctor of Science degree from the University of Bristol in 2002.

References

Living people
Fellows of the Royal Society
Place of birth missing (living people)
Year of birth missing (living people)